Artur  Oleksiyovych Rudko (born 7 May 1992) is a Ukrainian professional footballer who plays as a  goalkeeper for Ekstraklasa side Lech Poznań, on loan from Metalist Kharkiv.

Honours
Dynamo Kyiv
Ukrainian Premier League: 2015–16
Ukrainian Cup: 2013–14, 2014–15
Ukrainian Super Cup: 2016, 2018, 2019

References

External links 
 
  
 

1992 births
Living people
Footballers from Kyiv
Ukrainian footballers
Ukraine youth international footballers
Ukraine under-21 international footballers
Association football goalkeepers
FC Dynamo Kyiv players
FC Dynamo-2 Kyiv players
FC Hoverla Uzhhorod players
Pafos FC players
FC Metalist Kharkiv players
Lech Poznań players
Lech Poznań II players
Ukrainian Premier League players
Ukrainian First League players
Cypriot First Division players
Ekstraklasa players
II liga players
Ukrainian expatriate footballers
Expatriate footballers in Cyprus
Ukrainian expatriate sportspeople in Cyprus
Expatriate footballers in Poland
Ukrainian expatriate sportspeople in Poland